Zenkai Koigokoro!! ~Missing you~ (romaji for 全開恋心) is the fifteenth studio album by Japanese Pop band Deen. It was released on 29 July 2015 under the Epic Records Japan label.

Background

The album consists of two previously released single, Kimi ga Boku wo Wasurenai you ni Boku ga Kimi wo Oboeteiru and Sen Kai Koigokoro!. Both of these singles and coupling song Ari no Mama Dakishimeyou (from 42nd single) had received new arrangement under title Zenkai Mix.

Kouji Yamane's new song of Shangai Rock Star series had been released in this album as well. Emerald Ocean is the original and the first song performed by composer Shinji Tagawa.

This album was released in two formats: regular CD edition and limited CD+DVD-edition. The limited edition includes DVD footage of their live performance  Deen Live Joy Countdown Special ~Maniac Night W('0')W~.

Charting
The album reached #23 in its first week and charted for 3 weeks, selling 4,500+ copies.

Track listing

References

Sony Music albums
Japanese-language albums
2015 albums
Deen (band) albums